Nationality words link to articles with information on the nation's poetry or literature (for instance, Irish or France).

Events

Works published
 George Wither, Campo-Musae

Births
Death years link to the corresponding "[year] in poetry" article:
 Francisco Antonio de Fuentes y Guzmán (died 1700), Guatemalan historian and poet
 Fran Krsto Frankopan (died 1671), Croatian poet and politician
 Joseph de Jouvancy (died 1719), French poet, pedagogue, philologist, and historian
 François-Joseph de Beaupoil de Sainte-Aulaire (died 1742), French poet and army officer

Deaths
Birth years link to the corresponding "[year] in poetry" article:
 November 29 – William Cartwright (born 1611), English dramatist, poet and churchman
 Banarasidas (born 1586), businessman and poet in Mughal India
 Christoph Demantius (born 1567), German composer, music theorist, writer and poet
 Henry Glapthorne (born 1610), English poet and playwright
 Sir Sidney Godolphin (born 1610), English
 Cheng Jiasui (born 1565), Chinese landscape painter and poet
 Pedro de Oña (born 1570), first known Chilean poet
 Henry Peacham the Younger (born 1578), English poet and writer
 Sir Thomas Salusbury, 2nd Baronet (born 1612), Welsh politician and poet
 Aurelian Townshend (born 1583), English poet and playwright

See also

 Poetry
 17th century in poetry
 17th century in literature
 Cavalier poets in England, who supported the monarch against the puritans in the English Civil War

Notes

17th-century poetry
Poetry